M'Bagne is a department of Brakna Region in Mauritania. It includes the cities of M'Bagne, Niabina, Bagodine and Edbaye El Hijaj.

References 

Departments of Mauritania